Grammoa is a genus of moths in the subfamily Lymantriinae. The genus was erected by Per Olof Christopher Aurivillius in 1904.

Species
Grammoa striata Aurivillius, 1904 western Africa
Grammoa nigrolineata (Bethune-Baker, 1927) western Africa

References

Lymantriinae